Carex atrofuscoides is a species of sedge. Its native range is Tibet to Central China.

References 

atrofuscoides
Flora of Qinghai
Flora of Tibet